John Louis Beddington  (1893–1959) was a United Kingdom advertising executive, best known for his work as publicity director for Shell in the 1930s and as head of the Ministry of Information Films Division during World War II.

Biography

Early life
Jack Beddington was born in South Kensington, London in 1893 to Charles Lindsay Beddington and Stella Goldschmidt de Libantia. He was educated at Wellington College and Balliol College, Oxford.

During World War I he served with the King's Own Yorkshire Light Infantry. He was wounded at Ypres. In January 1918 he married Olivia Margaret Streatfeild.

Shell-Mex and BP
After a period working for the Asiatic Petroleum Company in Shanghai, Beddington became publicity manager for Shell UK in 1928. During the 1930s, Beddington worked as assistant general manager and director of publicity for Shell-Mex & BP, a joint marketing venture started in 1932 between Shell and BP. He employed a number of artists such as Paul Nash, John Piper, James Gardner and Graham Sutherland to produce artwork for Shell.

During this time, he spent a significant amount of money on producing films through the Shell Film Unit, on various topics. This unit was established by Edgar Anstey in 1934 as a result of a report written by documentary film-maker John Grierson about how Shell could make better use of film publicity. Rather than being direct advertising, the films produced served to promote a more positive image of Shell as existing for the public good rather than merely for profit. He also established, with John Betjeman, the 'Shell Guides' to English counties.

Second World War
In April 1940, Beddington was appointed director of the Ministry of Information Films Division, replacing Kenneth Clark. He remained in this post until 1946.

In August 1940, he renamed the GPO Film Unit as the Crown Film Unit, with Ian Dalrymple as its head. This unit focused on the production of documentary films, which Beddington supported even in the face of opposition from the Select Committee on National Expenditure. Almost three-quarters of all films produced or commissioned by the Films Division between 1940 and 1945 were written, directed or produced by members of the documentary film movement, a group of film-makers brought together by John Grierson. Although many of these documentaries were for non-theatrical distribution, under Beddington's tenure, the Crown Film Unit produced such feature-length documentaries as Target for Tonight, Desert Victory and Western Approaches.

After the war, Beddington and Barnett Freedman helped launch the Lyons' Lithograph series.

Jack Beddington’s medals to the right include the miniatures of the same below.  The large blue neck decoration is the CBE – Commander of the Most Excellent Order of the British Empire awarded in 1943 for services to the war effort as a civilian.  In the 3rd row of the top case are Carol Lobb’s (nee Beddington) WWII medals from serving as a code breaker at Bletchley Park.  She was the daughter of Jack and Olivia.

References

Bibliography
 
 

 Johnson, V., ‘Beddington, John Louis (1893–1959)’, in Oxford Dictionary of National Biography (2004. Oxford)
 Pronay, Nicholas, '"The land of promise": the projection of peace aims in Britain', in K.R.M. Short (ed.), Film & Radio Propaganda in World War II (1983)

External links
BFI Screenonline biography
National Motor Museum information sheet on Shell advertising posters

1893 births
1959 deaths
British Jews
British advertising executives
People from South Kensington
British Army personnel of World War I
King's Own Yorkshire Light Infantry soldiers